Van der Poel is a Dutch toponymic surname meaning "from the pool" (though poel could occasionally indicate a swamp as well). Abroad the surname is often concatenated to "Vanderpoel". People with this surname include:

Adri van der Poel (born 1959), Dutch racing cyclist
David van der Poel (born 1992), Dutch cyclocross racer, son of Adrie
Egbert van der Poel (1621–1664), Dutch genre and landscape painter
Jacques van der Poel (born 1963), Dutch racing cyclist
Jean van der Poel (1904–1986), South African historian
Mathieu van der Poel (born 1995), Dutch cyclocross racer, son of Adrie
Willem van der Poel (born 1926), Dutch computer scientist
Nils van der Poel (born 1996), Swedish speed skater

Vanderpoel
Aaron Vanderpoel (1799–1870), U.S. Representative from New York
Emily Noyes Vanderpoel (1842–1939), American artist, writer, and philanthropist.
Isaac V. Vanderpoel (1814–1871), American lawyer and New York State Treasurer
John Vanderpoel (1857–1911), Dutch-born American artist and teacher
John W. Vanderpoel (born 1949), American birdwatcher, birding guide and author
Kate Vanderpoel (born 1851), pen name of American composer Cornelia Townsend
Matilda Vanderpoel (1862–1950), American painter
Waid Vanderpoel (1922–2003), American financier and conservationist

Van der Poele
Georges Van Der Poele (fl. 1900), Belgian equestrian

Van de Poel
 (1915–1993), Dutch politician 

Vandepoel
Bart Vandepoel (born 1982), Belgian footballer

Van de Poele
Eric van de Poele (born 1961), Belgian racing driver

Van Depoele
Charles Joseph Van Depoele (1846–1892), Belgian-American electrical engineer and inventor

See also
Grand Prix Adri van der Poel a cyclo-cross race named after Adri van der Poel
Poel (disambiguation)
Poels, a related Dutch surname

Dutch-language surnames
Surnames of Dutch origin